Shahid Beheshti Teachers Training College is a college in Mashhad dedicated to training teachers for Iran education system. It has been named after Ayatollah Mohammad Beheshti, an Iranian clergyman who was very influential in Iran Revolution.

See also
Higher Education in Iran

References

External links
Shahid Beheshti TTC official website

Universities in Iran
Education in Razavi Khorasan Province